This is a list of Polish television related events from 2015.

Events
22 May - Szpilki na Giewoncie actor Krzysztof Wieszczek and his partner Agnieszka Kaczorowska win the sixteenth series of Taniec z Gwiazdami, becoming the first male celebrity since Rafał Mroczek in the third series to beat a female celebrity to win the show.
27 November - Singer Ewelina Lisowska and her partner Tomasz Barański win the seventeenth series of Taniec z Gwiazdami.
28 November - 21-year-old aerial silk artist Aleksandra Kiedrowicz wins the eighth series of Mam talent!. Krzysztof Iwaneczko wins the sixth series of The Voice of Poland on the same evening.

Debuts

Television shows

1990s
Klan (1997–present)

2000s
M jak miłość (2000–present)
Na Wspólnej (2003–present)
Pierwsza miłość (2004–present)
Dzień Dobry TVN (2005–present)
Taniec z gwiazdami (2005-2011, 2014–present)
Mam talent! (2008–present)

2010s
The Voice of Poland (2011–present)
X Factor (2011–present)

Ending this year

Births

Deaths

See also
2015 in Poland